Michael Žygimantaitis (before 1406 – shortly before February 10, 1452 in Moscow) was pretender to the throne of the Grand Duchy of Lithuania and the last male descendant of Kęstutis, Grand Duke of Lithuania. 

He supported his father Sigismund Kęstutaitis in power struggles with Švitrigaila. In 1435 he led his father's army to victory in the Battle of Wiłkomierz. After his father's assassination in 1440, Michael unsuccessfully fought against Casimir IV Jagiellon for the title of the Grand Duke of Lithuania. At first Michael was supported by Samogitia, but in 1441 Casimir issued a privilege confirming Samogitia's semi-autonomous status and thus avoiding a civil war. Until 1447, he was supported by the Dukes of Masovia. In 1448, Michael asked help from the Crimean Khanate. With their help he attacked and shortly took control of Kiev, Starodub, Novhorod-Siversky. Soon he was captured and transported to the Grand Duchy of Moscow where he died under unclear circumstances (possibly poisoned) in 1452. He was buried in Vilnius Cathedral.

At different times Michael was married to two daughters of Alexandra of Lithuania and Siemowit IV, Duke of Masovia: Anna and Catherine. In total he had three wives, all from Masovia: Anna (died in 1435), Eufemia (died in 1436) daughter of Bolesław Januszowic, and Catherine (died in 1479/80).

References

Further reading 
Kopistân'skij, Adriân, Michał Zygmuntowicz książę litewski : monografia historyczna, Lwów 1906.

External links 
  Genealogy of Michał Bolesław

1400s births
1452 deaths
Gediminids
Burials at Vilnius Cathedral